Alberto Ascari (13 July 1918 – 26 May 1955) was an Italian racing driver and a two time Formula One World Champion. He was a multitalented racer who competed in motorcycle racing before switching to cars. Ascari won consecutive world titles in 1952 and 1953 for Scuderia Ferrari. He was the team's first World Champion and the last Italian to date to win the title. This was sandwiched by an appearance in the 1952 Indianapolis 500. Ascari also won the Mille Miglia in 1954. Ascari was noted for the careful precision and finely-judged accuracy that made him one of the safest drivers in a most dangerous era until his death.

Ascari remains along with Michael Schumacher Ferrari's only back-to-back World Champions, and he is also Ferrari's sole Italian champion. As the first driver to win multiple World Championship titles, he held the record for most World Championship titles in 1952–54; as a result he is one of 4 drivers to have held the record for most World Championship titles. Juan Manuel Fangio held the record in 1954-2002 (jointly with Ascari in 1954) and Michael Schumacher has held the record since 2002, although Schumacher now also shares that record with Lewis Hamilton.

When Alberto was a young child, his father, Antonio, who was also a famous racing driver, died in an accident at the 1925 French Grand Prix. Alberto once admitted that he warned his children not to become extremely close to him because of the risk involved in his profession. Unfortunately, his warning proved true when he was killed during a test session for Scuderia Ferrari at the Autodromo Nazionale Monza. Ascari was notoriously superstitious and took great pains to avoid tempting fate. His unexplained fatal accident – at the same age as his father's, on the same day of the month and in eerily similar circumstances – remains one of Formula One racing's great tragic coincidences.

Early life
Born in Milan, Ascari was the son of Antonio Ascari, a talented Grand Prix motor racing star in the 1920s, racing Alfa Romeos.  Just a fortnight before Alberto's seventh birthday, Antonio was killed while leading the French Grand Prix in 1925 at the Autodrome de Linas-Montlhéry, but the younger Ascari had an interest in racing in spite of this. Such was his passion to become a racing driver like his father, twice he ran away from school.

He raced motorcycles in his earlier years. At the age of just 19, Ascari was signed to ride for the Bianchi team. It was after he entered the prestigious Mille Miglia in an Auto Avio Costruzioni 815, supplied by his father's close friend, Enzo Ferrari, in 1940 that he eventually started racing on four wheels regularly. He also married a local girl the same year.

When Italy entered World War II, the family garage, now run by Alberto, was conscripted to service and maintain vehicles of the Italian military. it was during this period, he established a lucrative transport business, supplying fuel to army depots in North Africa. His partner in the enterprise was a fellow racing driver, Luigi Villoresi. The pair did survive being capsized in Tripoli harbour along with a shipment of lorries. As their business supported the Italian war effort, it made them exempt from being called up during the war.

Career
Following the end of World War II Alberto Ascari began racing in Grands Prix with Maserati 4CLT. His teammate was Villoresi, who would become a mentor, teammate and friend to Ascari.  The pair were successful on the circuits in the North of Italy. Soon he was bestowed with the nickname Ciccio, meaning "Tubby". Formula One regulations were introduced by the FIA in 1946, with the aim of eventually replacing the pre-war Grand Prix structure. During the next four transitional years, Ascari was at the top of his game, winning numerous events around Europe. He won his first Grand Prix, the Gran Premio di San Remo in 1948 and took second place in the RAC International Grand Prix the same year, at Silverstone.

Ascari won another race with the team the following year, Gran Premio del General Juan Perón de la Ciudad de Buenos Aires. His biggest success came when he and Villoresi signed for Scuderia Ferrari. The team boss, Enzo Ferrari, had been a great friend and teammate to Antonio Ascari, and had taken a keen interest in Alberto's successes. That year, 1949 with Ferrari team and won three more races that year.

The first Formula One World Championship season took place in 1950, and the Ferrari team made its World Championship debut at Monte Carlo with Ascari, Villoresi and the famous French driver Raymond Sommer on the team. The team had a mixed year – their supercharged Tipo 125 was too slow to challenge the dominant Alfa Romeo team so instead Ferrari began working on an unblown 4.5l car. Much of the year was lost as the team's 2-litre Formula Two engine was progressively enlarged, though when the full 4.5l Tipo 375 arrived for the Gran Premio d'Italia (the final round of the championship) Ascari gave Alfa Romeo their sternest challenge of the year before retiring; he then took over teammate Dorino Serafini's car to finish second. The new Ferrari then won the non-championship Gran Premio do Penya Rhin.

Throughout 1951, Ascari was a threat to the Alfa Romeo team though initially he was undone by unreliability. However, after winning at the Nürburgring and Monza he was only two points behind Juan Manuel Fangio in the championship standings ahead of the climactic Gran Premio de España. Ascari took pole position, but a disastrous tyre choice for the race saw the Ferraris unable to challenge, Ascari coming home 4th while Fangio won the race and the title.

For 1952 the World Championship season switched to using the 2-litre Formula Two regulations, with Ascari driving Ferrari's Tipo 500 car. He missed the first race of the championship season as he was qualifying for the Indianapolis 500, at the time a World Championship event. He was the only European driver to race at Indy in its 11 years on the World Championship schedule, but his race ended after 40 laps without having made much of an impression, as a result of a wheel collapse. Returning to Europe he then won the remaining six rounds of the series to clinch the world title (also taking five non-championship wins) and recording the fastest lap in each race. He scored the maximum number of points a driver could earn since only the best four of eight scores counted towards the World Championship. Fangio missed most of the season after a crash in the Gran Premio dell'Autodromo di Monza in June.

He won three more consecutive races to start the 1953 season, giving him nine straight championship wins (not counting Indy) before his streak ended when he finished fourth in France, although it was a close fourth as the race was highly competitive. He earned two more wins later in the year to give himself a second consecutive World Championship, already becoming Formula One's first two-time champion.

Following a dispute over his salary, Ascari left Ferrari at the end of the season and switched to Lancia for the 1954 campaign. However, as their car was not eventually ready for the final race of the season, Gianni Lancia allowed him to drive twice for Maserati (sharing fastest lap at the RAC British Grand Prix) and once for Ferrari. Ascari did at least get to win the Mille Miglia that year, driving a Lancia sportscar, surviving the dreadful weather and the failure of a throttle spring, which was temporarily replaced with a rubber band. When the Lancia D50 was ready, Ascari took pole position on its debut and led impressively early on (and set fastest lap) before retiring with a clutch problem, meaning a full season of competing against Fangio's previously dominant Mercedes was much anticipated.

His 1955 season started promisingly, the Lancia taking victories at the non-championship races in Turin and Naples, where the Lancias took on and beat the hitherto all-conquering Mercedes. though in world championship event, he retired in Gran Premio de la Republica Argentina.

22 May 1955, the Grand Prix Automobiles de Monaco, it was late in the race when he crashed into the harbour, through hay bales and sandbags after missing a chicane while leading, reportedly distracted by either the crowd's reaction to Stirling Moss' retirement or the close attentions of the lapped Cesare Perdisa behind. Whatever distracted him, he approached the chicane too quickly, and chose the only way out and took his D50 clean through the barriers into the sea, narrowly missing a small barrel-sized iron bollard by about 30 cm.
His car disappeared into the Mediterranean Sea and sank, marked only by an oil slick and stream of bubbles and steam. Three seconds passed before Ascari's pale blue helmet appeared bobbing on the surface. He was hauled into a boat and escaped with a broken nose.

Death

On 26 May, he went to Monza to watch his friend Eugenio Castellotti test a Ferrari 750 Monza sports car. They were to co-drive the car in the 1000 km Monza race, having been given special dispensation by Lancia. Ascari was not supposed to drive that day but decided to try a few laps. In his jacket and tie, shirt sleeves, ordinary trousers and Castellotti's white helmet he set off. As he emerged from a fast curve on the third lap the car inexplicably skidded, turned on its nose and somersaulted twice. Thrown out onto the track, Ascari suffered multiple injuries and died a few minutes later. The crash occurred on the Curva del Vialone, one of the track's challenging high-speed corners. The corner where the accident happened, renamed in his honour, has been subsequently replaced with a chicane, now called Variante Ascari.

Motor racing fans from all over mourned, as Ascari was laid to rest next to the grave of his father in the Cimitero Monumentale in Milan, to be forever remembered as one of the greatest racers of all time. His distraught wife Mietta Ascari told Enzo Ferrari that "were it not for their children she would gladly have joined her beloved Alberto in heaven". His death is often considered to be a contributing factor to the withdrawal of Lancia from motor racing in 1955, just three days after his funeral (though the company was also in considerable financial trouble, needing a government subsidy to survive), handing his team, drivers, cars and spare parts over to Enzo Ferrari.

Legacy
A street in Rome (in the Esposizione Universale Roma area) is named in his honour, while both the Autodromo Nazionale Monza and Autodromo Oscar Alfredo Gálvez have chicanes named after him. In 1992, he was inducted into the International Motorsports Hall of Fame. The British supercar manufacturer Ascari Cars is named in his honour.

Italian-born American racing legend Mario Andretti counts Ascari as one of his racing heroes, having watched him at the Monza circuit in his youth.

Alberto Ascari also appears in Mark Sullivan's novel Beneath a Scarlet Sky.

In 1972 one of the chicanes at the Monza circuit was named in his honor Variante Ascari.

Ascari was inducted into the FIA Hall of Fame in December 2017.

In 2009, an Autosport survey taken by 217 Formula One drivers saw Ascari voted as the sixteenth greatest F1 driver of all time. In 2020, Carteret Analytics used quantitative analysis methods to rank Formula One drivers. According to this ranking, Ascari is Formula 1's fourth best driver of all time.

Racing record

Career highlights

Complete Formula One World Championship results

(key) (Races in bold indicate pole position; Races in italics indicate fastest lap)

* Indicates shared drive with Dorino Serafini
† Indicates shared drive with José Froilán González
‡ Indicates shared drive with Luigi Villoresi

Non-championship Formula One results
(key) (Races in bold indicate pole position; Races in italics indicate fastest lap)

* Indicates shared drive with Luigi Villoresi
† Indicates shared drive with André Simon
‡ Indicates shared drive with Sergio Sighinolfi

Complete 24 Hours of Le Mans results

Complete 12 Hours of Sebring results

Complete 24 Hours of Spa results

Complete Mille Miglia results

Complete Carrera Panamericana results

Complete 12 Hours of Casablanca results

Indianapolis 500 results

Formula One records
Ascari holds the following Formula One records:

Footnotes

See also
 Walk of Fame of Italian sport

References

Further reading
 Karl Ludvigsen/Mario Andretti. Alberto Ascari: Ferrari's First Double World Champion Haynes Manuals Inc.. 2000 978–1859606803.
 Pierre Menard/Jacques Vassal. Alberto Ascari: The First Double World Champion Chronosports. 2004 978–2847070644.
 Kevin Desmond. Man with Two Shadows: Story of Alberto Ascari Proteus Books, Ltd.. 1981 978–0906071090.

External links

Grand Prix History – Hall of Fame , Alberto Ascari
Alberto Ascari statistics
Statistical analysis of drivers, 1950–2013

1918 births
1955 deaths
Racing drivers from Milan
Grand Prix drivers
Italian Formula One drivers
Ferrari Formula One drivers
Maserati Formula One drivers
Lancia Formula One drivers
Formula One World Drivers' Champions
Formula One race winners
Indianapolis 500 drivers
24 Hours of Le Mans drivers
24 Hours of Spa drivers
12 Hours of Sebring drivers
Mille Miglia drivers
Carrera Panamericana drivers
International Motorsports Hall of Fame inductees
Sport deaths in Italy
Burials at the Cimitero Monumentale di Milano
World Sportscar Championship drivers
Recipients of the Silver Laurel Leaf